is a concert hall located in the Hideyo Noguchi Memorial Park in Yokohama, Japan. Built in 1952, it has hosted concerts by some of Japan's most successful musicians. In 2008, pianist Atsuko Seta gave a recital in the hall.

References

External links
Website 

Music venues completed in 1952
Buildings and structures in Yokohama
Concert halls in Japan
Tourist attractions in Yokohama